Sega tambour Chagos is one of the types of Sega music of Mauritius, with origins in the Chagos Archipelago. It is sung in the Chagossian creole language of the islands.

History
Chagos is part of the British Indian Ocean Territory and is claimed by Mauritius. Diego Garcia, the largest and most southerly of the islands, is inhabited. It contains a joint UK-US naval support facility. Between 1967 and 1973, former agricultural workers, earlier residents in the islands, were relocated primarily to Mauritius, but also to the Seychelles.

Instruments
Instruments used in Chagos Sega include:
 Tambour, a large, circular, percussive instrument that provides the basic rhythm
 Whistle
 Triangle
 rattle

See also
 Music of Mauritius
 Sega
 Jessy Marcelin

References

External links
 

 
Intangible Cultural Heritage in Need of Urgent Safeguarding